Rachel Ros (born 11 August 1942 in Cavaillon, Vaucluse) is a French singer best known in Europe for representing France in the Eurovision Song Contest 1964.

Biography 
She entered a singing competition organised by Mireille Hartuch who had invited Rachel to her "".

She went on to sign a contract with the Barclay Records label, and released her first (45 rpm) recording entitled "" in 1963.

In 1964, she represented France in the Eurovision Song Contest in Copenhagen with her entry called "", which was her greatest hit. She did not win, but scored 14 points and finished in fourth place.

Discography

45 rpm 
 "" (1963)
 ""
 "" (1964)
 "" (1965)
 "" (1966)
 "" (1967)
 "" (1967)
 her version of "" (1968) song performed in Eurovision Song Contest 1967 by Vicky Leandros

References 

People from Cavaillon
French women singers
1942 births
Eurovision Song Contest entrants for France
Eurovision Song Contest entrants of 1964
Living people